John Saris was chief merchant on the first English voyage to Japan, which left London in 1611. He stopped at Yemen, missing India (which he had originally intended to visit) and going on to Java, which had the sole permanent English trading station (or 'factory') in Asia. Saris had spent more than five years there before, as a merchant, having gone with the East India Company Second Voyage, under Henry Middleton. He became Chief Factor there, but returned to London in 1610. Now arrived again, in 1612, Saris decided to send his other ships home, taking just one, the Clove, on to Japan, where it arrived in summer 1613.

Career
Although the better known William Adams was the first Englishman to arrive in Japan in April 1600, he did so as the navigator of the Dutch ship Liefde (Charity), rather than aboard an English ship.  Saris received much aid from Adams, who had become the shogun's advisor on foreign affairs. As a result, Saris was able to meet the retired shogun, Tokugawa Ieyasu, who still held power, and also his son, the de facto Shōgun Tokugawa Hidetada. Ieyasu promised Saris extensive trade benefits for the English, and suggested, along with Adams, the port of Uraga as a strategic point of access to Edo Bay. But Saris decided to place the English factory far from the Shogun's capital of Edo (modern Tokyo), on Hirado, a small island off Kyūshū, Japan's largest southern island. The Dutch were already trading with some success, and it saved an extra leg of sailing along dangerous coasts.

Saris was partly welcomed in Japan because of the astonishing present he had brought. This was a telescope, described as 'silver-gilt' and very large. It was the first telescope ever to leave Europe, and the first to be made as a royal-level gift. It is not extant.

After some months, at the end of 1613, Saris sailed home to England, leaving Richard Cocks in charge of the Hirado operation. It failed, due in large part to the fact that the English came to Japan to sell their finest domestic product, which was woollen cloth, but it tended to rot en route. English efforts to develop a trade relationship with China at this time failed as well, and so the Hirado factory was abandoned 'temporarily' ten years later, in 1623.

Saris brought back Ieyasu's reciprocal gifts for King James, in thanks for the telescope, which were stunning paintings, and from the shogun himself, two suits of armour (which are extant). He encountered some opprobrium when he was accused of 'private trade' (smuggling) and was also discovered to have shown around London some erotic Japanese 'books and pictures' (shunga). However, he was exonerated by the East India Company of the first charge, while prudently surrendering his erotica for destruction.

Saris had become very rich from this voyage. He married Anne, daughter of the wealthy London merchant William Megges, granddaughter (on her mother's side) of Sir Thomas Cambell, Lord Mayor in 1609-10. She died in the 8th year of their marriage without issue, on February 21, 1623, aged 29 probably in childbirth. He never remarried. Saris then moved into a fine mansion near the Thames at Fulham, called Goodriches, which was behind All Saints Church in Fulham. It was pulled down in 1750, and Sir William Fowell's Alms-houses now stand upon its site.

Here he lived quietly until the winter of 1643, when he died on December 11, and was buried on the 19th, a fee of 2 shillings and 6 pennies being paid to the churchwardens "for the burial." His monument, a large black stone in the floor to the right of the altar, may still be seen in All Saints Church in Fulham, though it is barely legible and partially hidden by the choir-stalls. It bears the arms of himself and his wife and reads:

HERE LYETH INTERRED THE BODY OF
CAPTAYN JOHN SARIS OF FVLHAM IN
THE COVNTY OF MIDDLESEX ESQ. HE
DEPARTED THIS LIFE THE 11 DAY OF
DECEM Ao DNI 1643, AGED 63 YEARS.
HE HAD TO WIFE ANNE THE DAVGHTER
OF WILLIAM MIGGES OF LONDON ESQ.
SHE DEPARTED THIS LIFE THE 2ND DAY OF
FEBRVARY Ao DNI 1622 AND LIETH BV
RYD IN THE PARISHE CHVRCH OF ST
BOTOPLH IN THAMES STREET BEING
AGED 21 YEARES

In his will (a copy of which is in Somerset House), dated April 18, 1643, which was proved October 2nd, 1646, he left the bulk of his property to the children of his half-brother George, who had died in 1631. To the poor of Fulham parish, however, he left thirty pounds, to be expended in two-penny loaves, which were to be distributed to thirty poor people every Sunday, after sermon, until the amount was exhausted.

His unusual surname is a variant spelling of the more common Sayers.

Saris's journals were published in 1900, as The Voyage of Captain John Saris to Japan, 1613, edited by Ernest M. Satow.

See also
 Anglo-Japanese relations
 List of Westerners who visited Japan before 1868

Notes

References
Elison, George (1985). "Saris, John." Kodansha Encyclopedia of Japan. Tokyo: Kodansha Ltd.
The Voyage of Captain John Saris to Japan, 1613, edited by Sir Ernest M. Satow, 
"Historical Overview" 2015 Japan 400,  400th Anniversary of  Japan-British Relations

External links 
 voyage of Captain John Saris to Japan, 1613 (1900)

1580s births
1643 deaths
British expatriates in Japan
Sailors from London
Chief factors
British East India Company people
17th-century English people
Burials at All Saints Church, Fulham